Our House on the Hill is the second studio album by American rock band The Babies. It was released in November 2012 under Woodsist Records.

Track list

Personnel
The Babies
Kevin Morby – vocals, guitar
Cassie Ramone – vocals, guitar, artwork, layout
Brian Schleyer - bass
Justin Sullivan – drums

Additional musicians
Tim Presley – guitar, organ
Jenna Thornhill Dewitt - saxophone 
J.W. Reed - cello 

Production
Rob Barbato – producer, engineer, mixing, piano , organ 
Jarvis Taveniere - engineer 
Drew Fischer – engineer, mixing
Josh Bonati – mastering
Matt Rubin – photography

References

2012 albums
The Babies albums
Woodsist albums